Philip Hart (1912–1976) was an American lawyer and politician.

Philip Hart may also refer to:

 Philip Hart (cricketer) (born 1947), English cricketer
 Philip Hart (organist) (died 1749), English organist
 Phil Hart (politician), American politician from Idaho.
 Philip D'Arcy Hart (1900–2006), British medical researcher